Cutaneous T-cell lymphoma-associated antigen 5 is a protein that in humans is encoded by the CTAGE5 gene.

References

External links

Further reading